The first USS Whippet (SP-89) was an armed motorboat that served in the United States Navy as a patrol vessel from 1917 to 1919.
 
Whippet was a civilian motorboat completed in 1917 by Greenport Basin and Construction Company at Greenport on Long Island, New York. On 9 July 1917, the U.S. Navy acquired her from her owner, Mr. O. C. Jennings of New York City, for World War I service as a patrol boat.  She was commissioned as USS Whippet (SP-89) on 24 July 1917.

Whippet conducted antisubmarine and coastal defense patrols in the 2nd Naval District in southern New England during World War I.

On 11 January 1919, Whippet was decommissioned. She was stricken from the Navy List and returned to her owner the same day.

References

NavSource Online: Section Patrol Craft Photo Archive: Whippet (SP 89)

Patrol vessels of the United States Navy
World War I patrol vessels of the United States
Ships built in Greenport, New York
1917 ships